An intifada is a rebellion or uprising, or a resistance movement. It is a key concept in contemporary Arabic usage referring to a legitimate uprising against oppression.

Etymology 

Intifada is an Arabic word literally meaning, as a noun, "tremor", "shivering", "shuddering". It is derived from an Arabic term nafada meaning "to shake", "shake off", "get rid of", as a dog might shrug off water, or as one might shake off sleep, or dirt from one's sandals.

History 

The concept intifada was first used in modern times in 1952 within the Kingdom of Iraq, when socialist and communist parties took to the streets to protest the Hashemite monarchy, with inspiration of the 1952 Egyptian Revolution.

The concept was adopted in Western Sahara, with the gradual withdrawal of Spanish forces in the 1970s as the Zemla Intifada, but was essentially rooted into the Western Sahara conflict with the First Sahrawi Intifada – protests by Sahrawi activists in the Western Sahara, south of Morocco (1999–2004), Independence Intifada (Western Sahara) or Second Sahrawi Intifada and finally the Gdeim Izik protests in 2011.

In the Palestinian context, the word refers to attempts to "shake off" the Israeli occupation of the West Bank and Gaza Strip in the First and Second Intifadas, where it was originally chosen to connote "aggressive nonviolent resistance", a meaning it bore among Palestinian students in struggles in the 1980s and which they adopted as less confrontational than terms in earlier militant rhetoric since it bore no nuance of violence.

List of events named Intifada
Intifada may refer to these events:
Iraqi Intifada, a series of strikes and riots in Iraq in 1952, aimed against the Hashemite monarchy rule
October Revolution, a series of strikes, riots, and demonstrations in Sudan, that ended with the dissolution of the Abbud military regime and the beginning of second civilian rule in 1964
March Intifada, a leftist uprising against the British colonial presence in Bahrain in March 1965
Zemla Intifada, against Spanish colonial rule in then Spanish Sahara, in June 1970
In Lebanese internal conflicts:
February 6 Intifada (1984), during the Lebanese Civil War
Cedar Revolution or "Intifada of Independence", the events in Lebanon after Rafic Hariri's 2005 assassination
In the Israeli–Palestine conflict:
First Intifada, a Palestinian uprising against the Israeli occupation lasting from December 1987 to 1993
Second Intifada or the Al-Aqsa Intifada, a period of intensified Israeli-Palestinian violence, which began in late September 2000 and ended around 2005
2014 Jerusalem unrest, a series of violent acts and attacks in Jerusalem in 2014 sometimes referred to as "Intifada"
Israeli–Palestinian conflict (2015) – 2015 escalation in Israeli–Palestinian conflict, sometimes referred to as "Al-Quds Intifada" or "Jerusalem Intifada" or "Knife Intifada"
1990s uprising in Bahrain, an uprising demanding a return to democratic rule, also known as the "1990s Intifada"
1991 Iraqi uprisings, an armed uprising against Saddam Hussein in Iraq, also known as "Iraqi Intifada of 1991"
In the Western Sahara conflict:
First Sahrawi Intifada, protests by Sahrawi activists in the Western Sahara, south of Morocco (1999–2004)
Independence Intifada (Western Sahara) or Second Sahrawi Intifada, demonstrations and riots in Western Sahara, south of Morocco, beginning in May 2005
Gdeim Izik protests, also referred as Third Sahrawi Intifada or simply Third Inifada
2005 French riots often referred as "French Intifada" 
Arab Spring, a revolutionary wave which began on 18 December 2010 in Tunisia, sometimes referred to as "Intifada":
Tunisian Revolution, or Tunisian Intifada
2011 Yemeni Revolution, or Yemeni Intifada
Egyptian Revolution of 2011, or Egyptian Intifada
2011–2013 Sudanese protests, or Sudanese Intifada
2018–2022 Arab protests, a series of anti-government protests in several Arab countries, also known as "Arab Spring 2.0":
17 October Revolution, nicknamed the Tax Intifada
October 2019 Iraqi protests, nicknamed Iraqi Intifada

See also
 The Electronic Intifada, an online publication which covers the Israeli–Palestinian conflict from a Palestinian perspective

References

External links

 Andrew Hussey,  book 'The French Intifada: how the Arab banlieues are fighting the French state,'  The Guardian 23 February 2014

 
Social concepts